Alfred Page (26 December 1843 – 3 November 1911) was an Australian politician. He was born at Oatlands, Tasmania. In 1887 he was elected to the Tasmanian Legislative Council as the member for Macquarie, serving until his retirement in 1909. Page died in Hobart in 1911.

References

1843 births
1911 deaths
Independent members of the Parliament of Tasmania
Members of the Tasmanian Legislative Council
19th-century Australian politicians
20th-century Australian politicians